Caboverdensis and caboverdense are Latin adjectives meaning "pertaining to, or originating in Cape Verde". It may refer to any of the following species:

Allocosa caboverdensis, a wolf spider species
Hottentota caboverdensis, a scorpion species
Microlipophrys caboverdensis, a combtooth blenny species
Pollicipes caboverdensis, a goose barnacle species
Tritia caboverdensis, a mud snail (dog whelk) species
Tyrannodoris caboverdensis, a sea slug species

Synonyms
Hinia caboverdensis, synonym of Tritia caboverdensis, a mud snail (dog whelk) species
Nassarius caboverdensis, synonym of Tritia caboverdensis